Herbs are a New Zealand reggae group founded in 1979 and led by singer-guitarist Dilworth Karaka, the only constant member. Since its foundation Herbs has been multi-ethnic in membership and featured Samoans, Tongans, Cook Islanders, New Zealand europeans and Maori members. The 11th inductee into the New Zealand Music Hall of Fame, were once described as "New Zealand's most soulful, heartfelt and consistent contemporary musical voice". It has been said their debut EP What's Be Happen? "set a standard for Pacific reggae which has arguably never been surpassed".

Politics
The band has always been political, with links to the Polynesian Panthers and the cover of Whats' Be Happen (released during the 1981 Springbok tour) being an aerial photo of police action at Bastion Point in 1978. As well as race relations, the band took a strong stance on nuclear weapons in the Pacific with "French Letter".

History
Herbs produced a stream of reggae hits with some of the country's top talent. In the 1980s and the first half of the '90s, Herbs had 10 top 20 singles hits. Herbs also worked alongside UB40, Taj Mahal, Billy Preston, Neil Sedaka, Tina Turner, Neil Young, George Benson, Joe Walsh, and Stevie Wonder.

Herbs' music is upbeat and clear in its messages. Their 1982 New Zealand hit "French Letter", which spent 11 weeks on the charts, expressed New Zealand's anti-nuclear stance. Fourteen years later, it was re-recorded to garner support for the prevention of nuclear testing at Mururoa. Similarly, "No Nukes (The Second Letter)", "Nuclear Waste" and "Light of the Pacific" expressed much the same sentiment.

Herbs' third release and first full album Long Ago, which featured the 1984 single of the same name, was produced by well-known New Zealand bass player Billy Kristian. In 1986, former Be-Bop Deluxe bassist/vocalist Charlie Tumahai joined the group, having been a session musician for various international acts.

In 1986, "Slice of Heaven" with Dave Dobbyn reached number one on both the New Zealand and Australian charts. In 1989, Tim Finn joined them for "Parihaka" and, in 1992, Annie Crummer fronted the hit single "See What Love Can Do".

Around this time the band forged into producing, providing instrumentation for Samoan singing sensation John Parker. The album titled Another Girl produced a local hit, a reggae-funk inspired cover of the maori folk song "E Papa".

In 1989, the band was assisted by Eagles member Joe Walsh, who produced, played slide guitar and sung on the band's Homegrown album, which featured a cover of "Walk Away Renee", originally recorded by The Left Banke. Walsh announced he had joined Herbs, but the union lasted less than a year. Walsh gives credit to the members taking him to 'the ruins at Hawke's Bay', where he had 'a moment of clarity' – for inspiring him to pursue sobriety.

They also provided two songs to the 1990 film, The Shrimp on the Barbie: A cover of the Peggy Lee song "Mañana (Is Good Enough for Me)" and "Listen".

Herbs are considered pioneers of the Pacific reggae sound, having paved the way for contemporary New Zealand reggae groups such as Fat Freddy's Drop, Katchafire, The Black Seeds, and Trinity Roots.

Although their last album of new material was released in 1990, Herbs still perform in New Zealand and Australia, with guitarist Dilworth Karaka the last remaining member of the original line-up that released Whats' Be Happen? in 1981. Of the 2013 line-up, Karaka, keyboardist Tama Lundon (joined 1983) and percussionist Thom Nepia (joined 1985) remain from the band's late 1980s commercial peak.

"Homegrown" is featured on the soundtrack of Once Were Warriors.

Tama Renata died in November 2018.

Members

Herbs lineups

Other former members
Dave Pou – bass guitar
John Berkley – bass guitar
Alan Foulkes – percussion
Kristen Hapi – drums
Juanito Muzzio – percussion
Grant Pukeroa – vocals/drums
Max Hohepa – vocals/bass guitar
Lionel Nelson – vocals
Ned Webster – drums
Ryan Monga – drums

Past members
Toni Fonoti – vocals/percussion
Spencer Fusimalohi – vocals/guitar
Fred Faleauto (deceased) – vocals/drums
Dave Pou – bass guitar
John Berkley – bass guitar
Phil Toms – vocals/bass guitar
Morrie Watene – vocals/saxophone
Alan Foulkes – percussion
Carl Perkins (deceased) – vocals/percussion
Jack Allen – vocals/bass guitar
Willie Hona – vocals/guitar
Charlie Tumahai (deceased) – vocals/bass guitar
Gordon Joll – drums
Joe Walsh – vocals/guitar
Kristen Hapi – drums
Juanito Muzzio – percussion
Grant Pukeroa – vocals/drums
Max Hohepa – vocals/bass guitar
Lionel Nelson – vocals
Ned Webster – drums
Ryan Monga – drums
Tama Renata (deceased) – vocals/guitar
Thom Nepia (deceased)

Discography

Albums

Singles

Critical reception and awards

RIANZ Awards
The New Zealand Music Awards are awarded annually by the RIANZ in New Zealand.

Aotearoa Music Awards
The Aotearoa Music Awards (previously known as New Zealand Music Awards (NZMA)) are an annual awards night celebrating excellence in New Zealand music and have been presented annually since 1965.

! 
|-
| 2012 || Herbs || New Zealand Music Hall of Fame ||  || 
|-

References

APRA Award winners
New Zealand reggae musical groups
Polynesian-New Zealand culture in Auckland
Pacific reggae
Māori-language singers